The Tongue Chair is a classic chair designed by Arne Jacobsen in 1955 for Munkegaard School in Denmark. The Tongue is a typical piece of Arne Jacobsen's style and his second completed chair design, which was created just after the Ant.

The Tongue was later placed at the Royal Hotel in Copenhagen, however, it was not available internationally until the 1980s (for a short time only) and even after that could not find a place in the market. 

The Tongue chair is now back to the design and furniture industry and is restored in original design by Danish contract furniture manufacturer Howe.

References

1955 in art
Arne Jacobsen furniture
Chairs
Danish design
Individual models of furniture